Egebjerg is the name of several places in Denmark:

 Egebjerg, Horsens, in Horsens Municipality
 Egebjerg, Odsherred Municipality; see List of churches in Odsherred Municipality
 Egebjerg Church, a church in Fredensborg Municipality
 Egebjerg Municipality, a former municipality on the island of funen, now a part of Svendborg Municipality
 Transmitter Egebjerg, one of the tallest structures in Denmark